The  (sign: ℛℳ; abbreviation: RM) was the currency of Germany from 1924 until 20 June 1948 in West Germany, where it was replaced with the Deutsche Mark, and until 23 June 1948 in East Germany, where it was replaced by the East German mark. The Reichsmark was subdivided into 100 s (Rpf or ℛ₰). The Mark is an ancient Germanic weight measure, traditionally a half pound, later used for several coins; whereas  (realm in English), comes from the official name for the German state from 1871 to 1945, .

History

The Reichsmark was introduced in 1924 as a permanent replacement for the Papiermark. This was necessary due to the 1920s German inflation which had reached its peak in 1923. The exchange rate between the old Papiermark and the Reichsmark was  = 1012 ℳ (one trillion in American English and French, one billion in German and other European languages and British English of the time; see long and short scale). To stabilize the economy and to smooth the transition, the Papiermark was not directly replaced by the Reichsmark, but by the Rentenmark, an interim currency backed by the Deutsche Rentenbank, owning industrial and agricultural real estate assets. The Reichsmark was put on the gold standard at the rate previously used by the Goldmark, with the U.S. dollar worth .

Expansion outside the Reichsmark 

During this period a number of shell companies were created and authorized to issue bonds outside the Reichsmark in order to finance state projects. Nominally exchangeable at a 1:1 rate for Reichsmarks but then discounted by the Reichsbank this created secret monetary expansion without formally renouncing the gold standard of the Reichsmark.

World War II
With the annexation of the Federal State of Austria by Germany in 1938, the Reichsmark replaced the Austrian schilling. During the Second World War, Germany established fixed exchange rates between the Reichsmark and the currencies of the occupied and allied countries, often set so as to give economic benefits to German soldiers and civilian contractors, who were paid their wages in local currency. The rates were as follows:

Post-war 
After the Second World War, the Reichsmark continued to circulate in Germany, but with new banknotes (Allied Occupation Marks) printed in the US and in the Soviet Zone, as well as with coins (without swastikas). Inflation in the final months of the war had reduced the value of the Reichsmark from  = $1US to  = $1US and a barter economy had emerged due to the rapid depreciation. The Reichsmark was replaced by the Deutsche Mark at a rate of 10:1 (1:1 for cash and current accounts) in June 1948 in the Trizone and later in the same year by the East German mark in the Soviet Occupation Zone (colloquially also "Ostmark", since 1968 officially "Mark der DDR"). The 1948 currency reform under the direction of Ludwig Erhard is considered the beginning of the West German economic recovery; however, the secret plan to introduce the Deutsche Mark in the Trizone was formulated by economist Edward A. Tenenbaum of the US military government, and was executed abruptly on 21 June 1948. Three days later, the new currency also replaced the Reichsmark in the three Western sectors of Berlin. In November 1945, the Reichsmark was superseded by the Second Austrian schilling in Austria. In 1947 a local currency (the Saar mark, later replaced with the Saar franc) was introduced in the Saar.

Coins

In 1924, coins were introduced in denominations of 1 ℛ₰, 2 ℛ₰, 5 ℛ₰, 10 ℛ₰, and 50 ℛ₰, and 1 ℳ and 3 ℳ. The 1 ℛ₰ and 2 ℛ₰ were struck in bronze, and depicted a wheat sheaf. The 5 ℛ₰, 10 ℛ₰, and 50 ℛ₰ were struck in aluminium-bronze and depicted wheat stocks crossed into a stylized pattern. The two highest denominations were struck in .500 fine silver and depicted the German eagle standard. In 1925, .500 fine silver  and  coins were introduced for circulation, along with the first of many commemorative  and  coins. In 1927, nickel 50 ℛ₰ coins were introduced along with regular-type 5 ℛℳ coins, followed by the  coin in 1931.

Nazi Germany had a number of mints. Each mint location had its own identifiable letter. It is therefore possible to identify exactly which mint produced what coin by noting the mint mark on the coin. Not all mints were authorized to produce coins every year. The mints were also only authorized to produce a set number of coins with some mints allocated a greater production than others. Some of the coins with particular mint marks are therefore scarcer than others. With the silver  and  coins, the mint mark is found under the date on the left side of the coin. On the smaller denomination Reichspfennig coins, the mint mark is found on the bottom center of the coin.

A = Berlin
B = Vienna
D = Munich
E = Muldenhütten 
F = Stuttgart
G = Karlsruhe
J = Hamburg

4 ℛ₰ coins were issued in 1932 as part of a failed attempt by the Reichskanzler Heinrich Brüning to reduce prices through use of 4 ℛ₰ pieces instead of 5 ℛ₰ coins. Known as the Brüningtaler or Armer Heinrich ("poor Heinrich"), they were demonetized the following year. See Brüningtaler . The quality of the Reichsmark coins decreased more and more towards the end of World War II and misprints happened more frequently. This led to an increase in counterfeiting of money.

Production of silver 1 ℛℳ coins ended in 1927. In 1933, nickel  coins were introduced, and new silver  and  coins were introduced which were smaller but struck in .625 and .900 fineness so as to maintain the amount of silver. Between 1933 and 1939, a number of commemorative  pieces were issued. Production of the  coin ceased altogether. In 1935, aluminium 50 ℛ₰ coins were introduced, initially for just the one year. In 1937, nickel 50 ℛ₰ coins were issued and continued to be produced up to 1939, before reverting to aluminum. The eagle had two standard designs on most coin denominations, a soaring eagle and large swastika depicted on most earlier issues, and a more 'aggressive' eagle with less prominent swastika which became predominant in the 1940s.

During World War II, bronze and aluminium-bronze coins were replaced by zinc and aluminium, with the 2 ℛ₰ discontinued for potential of being too easily mistaken for the 5 ℛ₰ when struck in the same metal. The 1 ℛℳ, 2 ℛℳ, and 5 ℛℳ coins were no longer issued, replaced instead by banknotes. Aluminium 50 ℛ₰ coins were reintroduced to replace the nickel versions. This time around they had a longer run, being produced from 1939 to 1944. Lower denominations were produced in zinc from 1940 onwards. Due to their composition, these coins had poor durability and are hard to find in very good condition. The last production of coins bearing the swastika was in 1944 (1 ℛ₰, 5 ℛ₰, 10 ℛ₰, and 50 ℛ₰) and 1945 (1 ℛ₰ and 10 ℛ₰ only).

After the war, the Allies issued coins in relatively small numbers between 1945 and 1948:

1945–46: 1 ℛ₰ and 10 ℛ₰
1947–48: 5 ℛ₰ and 10 ℛ₰

These coins were issued with designs very similar to those minted in 1944–45, with the eagle changed to the pre-1935 die.

10 Reichspfennig

The zinc 10 Reichspfennig coin was minted by Nazi Germany between 1940 and 1945 during World War II, replacing the aluminium-bronze version, which had a distinct golden colour. It is worth 1/10 or .10 of a Reichsmark. Made entirely of zinc, the 10 ℛ₰ is an emergency issue type, similar to the zinc 1 ℛ₰ and 5 ℛ₰, and the aluminium 50 ℛ₰ coins from the same period.

Mint marks

Mintage

Banknotes

The first Reichsmark banknotes were introduced by the Reichsbank and state banks such as those of Bavaria, Saxony and Baden. This was followed by a second issue in the same denominations, dated between 1929 and 1936. The second issue commemorated persons who made contributions to German agriculture, industry, economy, science, and architecture:  issued in 1929 commemorated agronomist Albrecht Thaer;  issued in 1929 commemorated engineer, inventor, and industrialist Werner von Siemens;  issued in 1933 commemorated Prussian politician and banker David Hansemann; 100 ℛℳ issued in 1935 commemorated chemist and "father of fertilizer industry" Justus von Liebig;  issued in 1936 commemorated Prussian architect Karl Friedrich Schinkel.

A newer version of  note was introduced in 1939, using a design taken from an unissued Austrian S100  banknote type.  notes were issued in 1942. Throughout this period, the Rentenbank also issued banknotes denominated in Rentenmark, mostly in RM 1 and RM 2 denominations.

In preparation for the occupation of Germany, the United States issued occupation banknotes dated 1944, printed by the Forbes Lithograph Printing Company of Boston. These were printed in similar colours with different sizes for groups of denominations. Notes were issued for  ℳ, 1 ℳ, 5 ℳ, 10 ℳ, 20 ℳ, 50 ℳ, 100 ℳ, and 1,000 ℳ. The issuer was the Alliierte Militärbehörde ("Allied military authorities") with In Umlauf gesetzt in Deutschland ("in legal circulation in Germany") printed on the obverse.

These notes were convertible to US dollars at a rate of 10:1. Seeing an opportunity to procure foreign hard currency, the Soviet Union demanded copies of the engraving plates, ink, and associated equipment in early 1944, and on 14 April 1944 Henry Morgenthau and Harry Dexter White of the U.S. Treasury Department authorized the air transfer of these to the USSR. Using a printing plant in occupied Leipzig, the Soviet authorities printed large runs of occupation marks to fill Soviet coffers with dollars causing inflation and financial instability. An investigation by the United States Congress (Occupation Currency Transactions Hearings before the Committee on Appropriations, Armed Services and Banking and Currency, U.S. Senate, 1947) found that about $380,000,000 "more currency than there were appropriations for" had been circulated.

In 1947 Rhineland-Palatinate issued 5₰ and 10₰ notes with Geldschein on them.

Occupation Reichsmark

Coins and banknotes for circulation in the occupied territories during the war were issued by the Reichskreditkassen. Holed, zinc coins in 5 ℛ₰ and 10 ℛ₰ denominations were struck in 1940 and 1941. These served as legal tender alongside the currency of the occupied countries.

The coins were originally planned in great numbers of 100 million and 250 million each of the 5 ℛ₰ and 10 ℛ₰ coins respectively. The first embossing order, which was issued in April 1940, was about 40 million × 5 ℛ₰ and 100 million × 10 ℛ₰. The total amount was divided between each of the seven German mints after the embossing key of 1939. The contract was stopped in August 1940 as the Wehrmacht, which had requested the coins for Belgium and France, had no more need of it. When the embossing stopped, only Berlin ("A") and Munich ("D") produced significant quantities, but they still came to only a small extent of original production plans. The majority were melted down due to the limited supply of metal and thus, most mint marks are now quite rare (except for 1940 5 A and D, and 1940 10 A).

Concentration camp and POW Reichsmark currency
Various special issues of Reichsmark currency were issued for use in concentration and prisoner of war (POW) camps. None were legal tender in Germany itself. From 1942 to 1943 tokens were struck for use within the Łódź Ghetto.

Military Reichsmark currency

Special issues of Reichsmark currency were issued for use by the Wehrmacht from 1942 to 1944. This series was printed on only one side.

The 5 Mark note pictured, front and back, is Allied military currency ("AMC") printed at Forbes Lithograph Manufacturing Company in Boston for occupied Germany. There were different AMCs for each liberated area of Europe.

See also

 Öffa bills 1932 German government promissory notes
 MEFO Financial instrument used to finance Nazi German rearmament
 AM-Mark
 Pictorial list of postage stamps in Nazi Germany

References

Further reading
Ahamed, Liaquat. Lords of Finance: The Bankers Who Broke the World, Penguin Books, 2009

External links

 Weimar coins 
 Third Reich coins 
 Weimar coins 
 Third Reich coins 
 Historical Currency Conversion Tables, Reichsmarks to Dollars, 1870s–2012

1924 establishments in Germany
1948 disestablishments in Germany
Coins of Germany
Currencies of Europe
Currencies of Germany
Economy of Nazi Germany
Modern obsolete currencies
Ten-cent coins
Zinc and aluminum coins minted in Germany and occupied territories during World War II